The Egg Bowl (traditionally named the “Battle for the Golden Egg”) is the name given to the Mississippi State–Ole Miss football rivalry. It is an American college football rivalry game played annually between Southeastern Conference members Mississippi State University and Ole Miss (The University of Mississippi). 

The teams first played each other in 1901. Since 1927 the winning squad has been awarded possession of The Golden Egg trophy. The game has been played every year since 1944, making it the tenth longest uninterrupted series in the United States.  Ole Miss leads the series 64–46–6 through the 2022 season.

The game is a typical example of the intrastate sports rivalries between public universities. These games are usually between one bearing the state's name alone, and the land-grant university, often styled as "State University." Like most such rivalries, it is contested at the end of the regular season, in this case during the Thanksgiving weekend. The Egg Bowl has been played on Thanksgiving 23 times, including from 1998 to 2003, in 2013, and from 2017 to 2022. The game now alternates between the two respective campuses. Contests in odd-numbered years are played in Starkville, Mississippi at Miss St, and even-numbered years in Oxford, Mississippi at Ole Miss.

Series history
The first game in the series was played on October 28, 1901, at Mississippi State. Mississippi State, then known as the Mississippi A&M College and nicknamed the Aggies, defeated Ole Miss, nicknamed the Red and Blue at that time, by a final score of 17–0. The two squads met on the gridiron every year from 1901 until 1911 and then, after a three-year hiatus, resumed the series in 1915; since that 1915 meeting the two teams have met on the field every season with the exception of the 1943 season, when neither school fielded teams due to World War II.  

From 1973 through 1990, the game was played at Mississippi Veterans Memorial Stadium in Jackson, which seats about 62,000. The stadium was centrally located in the state and the state's only venue capable of seating the anticipated crowd; for many years Vaught–Hemingway Stadium in Oxford seated only about 32,000 and Scott Field in Starkville seated only about 31,000. Both  campus venues have been considerably expanded and are now capable of accommodating the expected crowds, and both have been continually upgraded to the point where they are superior in amenities to Veterans Memorial Stadium.

At one point the level of intensity was such that a victory by one of the schools in this game could salvage what had otherwise been a poor season. This dynamic has proven not to be applicable every year, however; in 2004 Ole Miss won the game but fired its coach, David Cutcliffe, the next year following a disappointing season.
Mississippi State dominated the first part of the series with a 17–5–1 record against Ole Miss. However, Ole Miss now leads the series, due largely to its performance in the rivalry under Johnny Vaught. Vaught went 19–2–4 against Mississippi State during his two separate tenures at Ole Miss. The series has favored Mississippi State most recently; as of the 2019 season, when removing the wins that Ole Miss vacated from 2012 and 2014 due to NCAA violations, the past ten games have included only two victories for Ole Miss and six for Mississippi State.

The Golden Egg trophy
The Aggies (Bulldogs) dominated the early days of the series including a 13-game A&M winning streak from 1911 to 1925 during which time the Aggies outscored the Red and Blue by a combined 327–33. Through 1925 Ole Miss had won only five times out of 23 total contests. In 1926 when the Red and Blue ended their 13-game losing streak by defeating A&M 7–6 in Starkville, the Ole Miss fans rushed the field with some trying to tear the goalposts down. A&M fans did not take well to the Ole Miss fans destroying their property and fights broke out. Some A&M fans defended the goal posts with wooden chairs, and several injuries were reported. According to one account:

To prevent such events in the future, students of the two schools created The Golden Egg, a large trophy which has been awarded to the winning team each year since 1927. In the event of a tie, the school that won the game the previous year kept the trophy for the first half of the new year and then the trophy was sent to the other school for the second half of the new year.

The trophy is a large football-shaped brass piece mounted to a wooden base and traditionally symbolizes supremacy in college football in the state of Mississippi for the year. The footballs used in American football in the 1920s were considerably more ovoid and blunter than those in use today and similar to the balls still used in rugby; the trophy thus, to modern eyes, more resembles an egg than a football. 

The game was given the nickname "Egg Bowl" by The Clarion-Ledger sportswriter Tom Patterson in 1979.

Notable games

1901: The first ever meeting between the two schools was delayed for 40 minutes because of a dispute between the rivals over the eligibility of A&M's Norvin E. (Billy) Green, who had played for the Ole Miss squad the year before.  Eventually it was agreed that Green would not play and the game kicked off with A&M going on to win by a score of 17–0.
1902: The second contest resulted in the first Ole Miss victory by a score of 21–0. 
1903: The third meeting between the Aggies and the Red and Blue resulted in the first tie in series history and marked the first time that neither team was shut out.  A&M entered the contest undefeated, untied, and unscored upon.  A&M led 6–0 for most of the games, but Ole Miss tied the score with less than a minute to go when halfback Fred Elmer went 70 yards for a touchdown and Edgar Moss kicked the extra point to make it 6–6 (touchdowns were worth 5 points at the time).  Those were the only points that the Aggies would surrender that season, as they went to tie Tulane in their final contest of the season by a score of 0–0.
1904:  This marked the first time that the game was played off campus, with the two squads meeting at the Mississippi and West Alabama Fairgrounds as part of the fair.  Ole Miss went on to win 17–5.
1905: This game featured two "firsts", the first time the game was played in Jackson and the first time the game was played on Thanksgiving.  The games was held at the Mississippi State Fairgrounds and because there was no barrier to stop them, the crowd poured out onto the playing field for a closer look at what, for many, was their first college game. The curious got so close that at one point, the University captain refused to continue until the field was cleared. A&M would eventually win the contest 11–0.
1906 –  Passing Fancy: James C. Elmer of Ole Miss caught the first forward pass in the history of the rivalry. Elmer's kicking accounted for 13 points in a 29 to 5 rout. For the first time the game marked the end of the season for not one but both teams.
1907: Ole Miss and Mississippi A&M played a scoreless first half in extremely muddy conditions. Before the second half began, Ole Miss head coach Frank A. Mason brought out an urn filled with whisky-laced coffee in an attempt to warm his players. Sloppy second-half play resulted in a 15 to 0 A&M victory. After the game, many of the Ole Miss players blamed Mason for the loss. When asked if his team was returning home that night, Mason replied "Yes, the team is going north at 11 o'clock. I'm going in another direction, and hope I never see them again!" It would be his final game as head coach.
1908: With a 44–6 victory the Aggies became the first of the squads to claim consecutive victories in the contest.  A&M scored a total of 8 touchdowns (only worth 5 points at that time) in the game.
1911: Earlier that week a new set of stands had been added on the east side of The Fairgrounds in Jackson.  As the teams prepared for kickoff the new stands collapsed injuring at least 60 people, some seriously.  Despite the disaster, the game proceeded without interruption and resulted in a 6 to 0 A&M win. The Aggies would end the season in Havana, Cuba for their first ever postseason appearance, a 12–0 victory over the Havana Athletic Club in the Bacardi Bowl.
1915: After a three-year hiatus the two squads met on the gridiron in a game played in Tupelo.  The A&M squad proved too much for Ole Miss and rolled to a 65–0 victory in which they scored ten touchdowns.  The contest remains the most one-sided in series history.
1918 – Gotcha! Twice!: This marked the only time that the two teams would square off twice in the same season.  A&M won the first contest in Starkville 34–0 and completed the sweep taking the second game in Oxford 13–0.  The Rebels were coached that season by legendary future Mississippi A&M baseball coach C.R. "Dudy" Noble
1926 – A&M's Streak Ends: After 13 straight losses to the Aggies, Ole Miss pulled off a victory in Starkville by a score of 7–6.  The ensuing melee between fans prompted the purchase of a football-shaped trophy to be awarded to the winner each year upon their victory, and kept on their respective campus until the game was played again the following year.
1927 – First Game for The Trophy: In the first game after the commissioning of the Golden Egg Trophy was played on Thanksgiving Day in Oxford.  Ole Miss posted back-to-back wins against A&M for the first time since 1909–10, taking the egg by a final score of 20–12.
1936: Mississippi State got its first win in the series since the creation of the Golden Egg ending an Ole Miss 10-game unbeaten streak (9–0–1) in the series by a final score of 26–6.
1964: The 17-year unbeaten streak (14–0–3) by Ole Miss against Mississippi State came to an end as the Bulldogs claimed a 20–17 victory.
1976 and 1977: Mississippi State won the Egg Bowl these two years but had to forfeit the wins due to NCAA sanctions.
1983 – The Immaculate Deflection, or the Wind Bowl: In what has become known to Ole Miss and Mississippi State fans as "The Immaculate Deflection," the 1983 Egg Bowl played in Jackson is notable because the wind helped preserve Ole Miss' 24–23 victory. Down by a point with 24 seconds left in the game, Mississippi State kicked what would have been a 27-yard game-winning field goal. Mississippi State freshman kicker Artie Cosby kicked it straight and long and what appeared to be over the crossbar, but as the ball reached the goal posts, a 40 mph gusting wind suspended the ball inches from the uprights, after which it fell short of the goal post, securing the victory for the Rebels.
1991 – Back to Campus: In the first Egg Bowl played on either campus since 1972 and the first played at Mississippi State since 1971, first year Mississippi State head coach Jackie Sherrill led the Bulldogs to a 24–9 victory over the Rebels. The victory was State's first over Ole Miss at Starkville since 1942, ending an 0–11–3 drought. 
1992 – The Stand: In a defensive struggle that saw a combined 12 turnovers between the two, a goal line stand of epic proportions by the "Red Death" defense ultimately gave Ole Miss the win.  Mississippi State had 11 plays in 2 different possessions inside the Rebel 10 within the last 4 minutes of the contest but failed to score.  The first possession ended on a third down pass that was intercepted in the end zone by Michael Lowery who would bring the ball out to the 2-yard line.  A couple of plays later saw Rebel running back Cory Philpot fumble the ball back to the Dogs, the Rebels' 7th turnover on the day.  On the ensuing possession, State had fourth and goal and the pass was incomplete.  However, pass interference on Orlanda Truitt kept the drive alive, moving the ball to the 2.  However, the next four plays resulted in negative yardage, with the final pass falling incomplete with only 20 seconds remaining.  The Rebels won 17–10.
1997: The 1997 contest was notable for two things: first for the melee that broke out between the teams before the game kicked off and second for the dramatic way in which it ended. Trailing 14–7 with 2:12 remaining the Rebels put together a 64-yard drive that culminated with a 10-yard TD pass to WR Andre Rone. Ole Miss then elected to attempt a two-point conversion to take the lead rather than kick the extra point for the tie. Rebel QB Stewart Patridge completed a pass Cory Peterson  with 25 seconds left that gave Ole Miss a 15–14 lead(Cory Peterson freely admits to all now that he actually trapped the ball and the 2 point conversion should not have counted).  A late pass by Mississippi State was intercepted by Ole Miss DB Tim Strickland to secure the win for the Rebels.  Both teams finished 7–4, however, with limited bowl spots available, Ole Miss would secure its first bowl berth since 1992 while Mississippi State would fail to reach a bowl for the 3rd consecutive season.
1998: Mississippi State clinched the SEC West division title after winning 28–6. This win sent Mississippi State to the SEC Championship Game where they were defeated 24–14 by eventual national champion Tennessee. This was also Tommy Tuberville's last game as Ole Miss coach. Tuberville departed two days after this game to accept the same position at SEC West rival Auburn, with the Rebels hiring Tennessee offensive coordinator David Cutcliffe as Tuberville's replacement. 
1999 – The Pick and the Kick: This game is best known for its dramatic ending. Down 20–6, Mississippi State rallied late in the 4th quarter to tie the game. With 20 seconds left, instead of kneeling the ball to go to overtime, Mississippi decided to run a play, deep in their own territory. Rebel quarterback Romero Miller dropped back and lobbed a deep pass which was deflected by the hands and then the foot of Mississippi State cornerback Robert Bean before being intercepted by Eugene Clinton and returned deep into Rebel territory. On the next play, with 8 seconds left, Bulldog kicker Scott Westerfield kicked a 44-yard game-winning field goal.
2003 – Number 100: The 2003 game marked the 100th meeting between the two teams. Ole Miss earned a share of its first SEC West division title  with Eli Manning leading the team. A torrential downpour prevailed much of the game, with both teams fighting tooth and nail for the first 20 or so minutes of the contest.  The heavily favored Rebs ultimately proved to be too much as the Rebels had 3 2nd quarter scores to take a 24–0 lead into the locker room.  The final would be 31–0 marking the first shutout by the Rebels in this rivalry since 1971 (48–0). This Egg Bowl marked Jackie Sherrill's final game as a football coach as in the middle of the 2003 season he had announced his retirement.  Sherrill had an overall record of 7–6 against the Rebels.
2007 – The Comeback: Mississippi State trailed 14–0 with less than 8 minutes left to play in the fourth quarter when Ole Miss Head Coach Ed Orgeron elected to go for a fourth down at the Mississippi 49-yard line.  Rebel running back BenJarvus Green-Ellis was stopped for a loss turning the ball over on downs.  The Bulldogs drove in, scored a touchdown, seized the momentum and went on to win the game 17–14.  It marked the last game of Ed Orgeron's tenure as head coach after the Rebels went 0–8 in the SEC.
2008 – Croom's Farewell: In Houston Nutt's first Egg Bowl as the Ole Miss Head Coach, the Rebels would avenge the loss from 2007 in impressive form, utterly dominating Mississippi State in Oxford by the score of 45–0.  The game featured the largest margin of defeat in any Egg Bowl game since 1971 and was the second shutout win in 5 years for Ole Miss.  The game brought Ole Miss to 8–4 (5–3 in the SEC) and eventually secured them a bid to the 2009 Cotton Bowl Classic.  The loss dropped Mississippi State to 4–8 (2–6 in the SEC).  Mississippi State head coach Sylvester Croom, resigned only hours later, leaving Mississippi State after 5 years at the helm and with a career record of 21–38.
2009: The Rebels, fresh off an upset win over LSU, came into Starkville with an 8–3 record and a #20 ranking, while the Bulldogs had already clinched bowl ineligibility at 4–7. However, Mississippi State's Anthony Dixon ran for 133 yards and a touchdown, backup quarterback Chris Relf ran for 131 yards a touchdown and completed two touchdown passes, and cornerback Corey Broomfield sealed the 41–27 win by returning an interception for a touchdown in the fourth quarter.
2012: Ole Miss was forced to vacate this win due to NCAA violations.
2013: Mississippi State claimed a 17–10 overtime win over Ole Miss on a cold, Thanksgiving night at Davis Wade Stadium. It was the first Egg Bowl overtime game. Injured Bulldog quarterback Dak Prescott came off the bench with his team trailing 10–7 in the middle of the 4th quarter, leading Mississippi State to a game-tying field goal that forced overtime. In overtime, Prescott scored a touchdown on fourth down from the three yard line. On the ensuing Ole Miss possession, Nickoe Whitley stripped the ball from Rebel quarterback Bo Wallace as he tried to score a game-tying touchdown.  Mississippi State's Jamerson Love recovered the ball in the endzone to seal the victory.
 2014: The 2014 game was of particular importance due to its implications on post-season play. Mississippi State entered the game with a 10–1 overall record, 6–1 in conference play, and a #4 ranking in the College Football Playoff poll. A win for Mississippi State, coupled with a loss by Alabama in the Iron Bowl, would give the Bulldogs the SEC West championship and a berth in the SEC Championship Game.  Ole Miss entered the game #19, marking only the fifth time in the rivalry's history, and the first since 1999, that both teams entered the Egg Bowl ranked. For the first time since 1964, the game was televised by a national network. CBS, acknowledging the importance of the game, along with contractual limitations on how many times it can feature each team in its SEC package, passed on televising the Iron Bowl and chose to carry the Egg Bowl instead. In an upset, Ole Miss defeated Mississippi State 31–17. The victory was highlighted by a strong performance from Ole Miss running back Jaylen Walton who had a career-high with 148 yards rushing including a 91-yard touchdown.  Ole Miss would later vacate this win due to NCAA violations.
 2015: #18 Ole Miss raced to a 21-0 first quarter lead and never looked back in a decisive 38-27 win over #21 Mississippi State at Davis Wade Stadium. The Rebels finished 10-3 (6-2 in the SEC) after Sugar Bowl win over Oklahoma State. Mississippi State regrouped after the Egg Bowl to beat North Carolina State at the Belk Bowl and finished the year 9-4 (4-4 in the SEC). 
 2016: Ole Miss and Mississippi State entered the game tied with 2-5 conference records.  A home win for Ole Miss would have clinched bowl eligibility for the Rebels whereas a win for Mississippi State would have given a 5-7 Bulldogs a chance to play in a bowl game due to the school's superior Academic Progress Rate.  In a mild upset, Mississippi State defeated Ole Miss 55-20 thanks largely to the performance of sophomore quarterback Nick Fitzgerald who rushed for a school-record 258 yards.   The 35-point win for the Bulldogs was the biggest-ever Mississippi State win in Oxford.
 2017: Following a dislocated ankle injury for Mississippi State quarterback Nick Fitzgerald early in the first quarter, the unranked Rebels built a 24-6 third quarter lead over the Bulldogs in Starkville.  Despite five Mississippi State turnovers, true freshman quarterback Keytaon Thompson would lead the Bulldogs to a unanswered 15-point rally in the fourth quarter to finish the game as a 31-28 loss for Mississippi State.  After scoring a touchdown for Ole Miss in the third quarter, D.K. Metcalf mocked the home team by mimicking a dog urinating on the Bulldogs' playing turf, intentionally causing the imposition of a 15-yard unsportsmanlike conduct penalty against his team.  No apology for the behavior was issued by his Head Coach Matt Luke, the University of Mississippi, or any other responsible person; and apparently no discipline was imposed on Metcalf or anyone else.  Rather, Metcalf's actions seemed to provide a source of pride and joy throughout much of the University of Mississippi community.  Following the game, Mississippi State coach Dan Mullen departed to accept the head coaching position at Florida while the "interim" designation was dropped from Ole Miss' coach Matt Luke's title.
2018 – The Egg Brawl: This game was notable for a brawl that occurred at the end of the third quarter. Ole Miss, trailing 28-3, appeared to score a touchdown to end the quarter. One of the Mississippi State players continued fighting for the ball long after Ole Miss player A.J. Brown crossed the goal line with the ball. Players then started to shove each other, and eventually punches were exchanged and the benches cleared. Four players, one for Ole Miss and three for Mississippi State, were ejected, and every player on both teams were given unsportsmanlike conduct penalties. The touchdown that Brown had appeared to score was then taken off the board due to the game clock expiring before the snap. Mississippi State went on to pick up a 35-3 win in Oxford.
2019 – The Piss, the Miss, and the Double Dismiss: With both teams needing a win to ensure bowl eligibility, Ole Miss trailed Mississippi State 21-14 with nine seconds left. Matt Corral completed a 2-yard pass to wide receiver Elijah Moore for an Ole Miss touchdown with four seconds left; Moore then drew a 15-yard excessive celebration penalty for pretending to be a dog urinating in the end zone for his touchdown celebration, forcing the team to kick the extra point from 35 yards away rather than 20. The extra point attempt failed, and Mississippi State won 21-20. Head coach Matt Luke and athletics director Keith Carter issued a joint public apology for Moore's behavior, describing his conduct as "disappointing and unacceptable"; Moore himself also publicly apologized. Ole Miss fired Luke the following Sunday, while Mississippi State would fire Joe Moorhead following a loss in the Music City Bowl, when it was revealed that quarterback Garrett Shrader did not play in the game after being injured in a fight during pre-bowl practice.
2022 - Leach's Last Win: Ole Miss quarterback Jaxson Dart threw a late touchdown with 1:25 left, capping a 99 yard drive. However, the Bulldogs stopped the following two point conversion to seal a 24-22 victory. This game would end up being the final game coached by Mississippi State's Mike Leach before his unexpected death.

Game results

See also 
 List of NCAA college football rivalry games
 List of most-played college football series in NCAA Division I

Notes

References

College football rivalries in the United States
Mississippi State Bulldogs football
Ole Miss Rebels football
1901 establishments in Mississippi